WJMZ-FM (107.3 FM) is a commercial radio station licensed to Anderson, South Carolina and serving the Upstate South Carolina region, including Greenville and Spartanburg. The station is owned by SummitMedia and airs an urban adult contemporary radio format. It is among the highest rated stations in the Greenville/Spartanburg radio market, according to Nielsen ratings.

WJMZ is licensed by the Federal Communications Commission (FCC) to broadcast with an effective radiated power (ERP) of 100,000 watts with a tower at 1,010 feet height above average terrain (HAAT).  Its studios are located at Noma Square in Downtown Greenville, and its transmitter is located off Massey Road in Pendleton.

History
107.3 began as WANS-FM on October 24, 1967, the FM sister station to 1280 WANS.  They broadcast out of studios in Anderson on Clemson Boulevard.  WANS-AM-FM were highly rated Top 40 radio stations through the 1960s and 70s, with the AM station eventually switching to oldies music, while the FM continued playing the hits.  After being a top 40 powerhouse for many years, owner Radio Anderson sold them to Degree Communications, another local owner, in 1988.  The new owner cut staff, promotions and other costs.  The AM once again simulcast the FM station.  Ratings dropped in a drastic way.

By 1990, the station was bankrupt.  WANS-FM flipped from top 40 to adult contemporary-formatted WWMM as "Magic 107.3" in February 1992 after the station was sold to Desert Communications for $3 million.  In 1994, due to low ratings and facing competition from WMYI and WSPA-FM, the adult contemporary format was dropped.  107.3 WWMM changed its format and call sign to urban contemporary as "107.3 JAMZ", WJMZ-FM.

In 1995, AmCom Carolinas Inc. sold WJMZ to WROQ owner ABS Communications Inc., for $5.3 million.  ABS immediately took over WJMZ in a local marketing agreement.  In 2001, the station was sold to Cox Media Group, a major radio, TV and newspaper owner based in Atlanta.

WJMZ carried the station slogan, "The Peoples' Station" until 2003, when it changed to "Today's R&B."  In 2009, WJMZ-FM earned a Marconi Award as Urban Station of the Year from the National Association of Broadcasters.  In 2010, disc jockey Kelly Mac won the Marconi Award for Medium Market Personality of the Year.

On July 20, 2012, Cox Radio, Inc. announced the sale of WJMZ-FM and 22 other stations to Summit Media LLC for $66.25 million. The sale was consummated on May 3, 2013.

HD radio

WJMZ-FM HD2
WJMZ-FM HD2 broadcasts an alternative rock format branded as X98.5 (relayed on FM translator W253BG 98.5 FM Greenville).

WJMZ-FM HD3
WJMZ-FM HD3 broadcast an adult hits format branded as 99.5 Jack FM, relayed on FM translator W258CB 99.5 FM Greenville).

On June 1, 2021, WJMZ-HD3 and W258CB changed their format from adult hits to 1980s hits, branded as “Awesome 99.5”.

WJMZ-FM HD4
WJMZ-FM HD4 simulcasts sister station WHZT in order to increase its coverage area in Spartanburg County.

References

External links

JMZ-FM
1963 establishments in South Carolina
Radio stations established in 1963
Urban adult contemporary radio stations in the United States